Pat Cash and Mark Woodforde successfully defended their title, defeating Jeremy Bates and Anders Järryd in the final, 6–3, 5–7, [10–5] to win the senior gentlemen's invitation doubles tennis title at the 2011 Wimbledon Championships.

Draw

Final

Group A
Standings are determined by: 1. number of wins; 2. number of matches; 3. in two-players-ties, head-to-head records; 4. in three-players-ties, percentage of sets won, or of games won; 5. steering-committee decision.

Group B
Standings are determined by: 1. number of wins; 2. number of matches; 3. in two-players-ties, head-to-head records; 4. in three-players-ties, percentage of sets won, or of games won; 5. steering-committee decision.

External links
Draw

Men's Invitation Doubles, Senior